Stadsbygd is a former municipality in the old Sør-Trøndelag county, Norway. The municipality existed from 1838 until its dissolution in 1964. The  municipality existed on the southern part of the Fosen peninsula, along the Trondheimsfjorden in what is now the municipality of Indre Fosen in Trøndelag county. The administrative centre was the village of Stadsbygd, just north of the Stadsbygd Church.

History
The municipality of Stadsbygd was established on 1 January 1838 (see formannskapsdistrikt). In 1860, the northwestern district of Stadsbygd (population: 3,733) was separated to form a municipality the new municipality of Rissa. The split left Stadsbygd with a population of 1,828. During the 1960s, there were many municipal mergers across Norway due to the work of the Schei Committee. On 1 January 1964, the Ingdalen district south of the Trondheimsfjord (population: 171) was merged into the municipality of Agdenes. The rest of Stadsbygd, north of the Trondheimsfjord, (population: 1,616) was merged with the neighboring municipalities of Rissa (population: 3,264) and the southern part of the municipality of Stjørna (population: 1,868).

Government
All municipalities in Norway, including Stadsbygd, are responsible for primary education (through 10th grade), outpatient health services, senior citizen services, unemployment and other social services, zoning, economic development, and municipal roads. The municipality is governed by a municipal council of elected representatives, which in turn elects a mayor.

Municipal council
The municipal council  of Stadsbygd was made up of representatives that were elected to four year terms. The party breakdown of the final municipal council was as follows:

See also
List of former municipalities of Norway

References

Indre Fosen
Former municipalities of Norway
1838 establishments in Norway
1964 disestablishments in Norway